The Gartell Light Railway is a privately run narrow gauge railway located at Yenston in the Blackmore Vale, south of Templecombe, in Somerset, England. The railway has 4 stations - Common Lane, Pinesway Junction, Park Lane and Tower View.

The railway is controlled using a comprehensive signalling system operated from two signalboxes - Common lane and Pinesway Junction. Both signalboxes control a mix of semaphore and colour light signals with mechanically operated points.

The railway is open to the public on selected dates through the year when it normally operates an intensive 3 train operation with departures from Common Lane station every 20 minutes through the day between 10:30 and 16:30.

The route of the GLR
 Park Lane
 Pinesway Junction
 Tower View

Locomotives

See also
 British narrow gauge railways

References

External links 

The Railway website

Heritage railways in Somerset
2 ft gauge railways in England
Museums in Somerset
Railway museums in England